The Pennsylvania North is a high-rise building located in Washington, D.C., United States. The building was constructed in 1990. The architect of the building was Hartman-Cox Architects. The building serves as an office use building.

See also
List of tallest buildings in Washington, D.C.

References

Commercial buildings completed in 1990
Skyscraper office buildings in Washington, D.C.
1990 establishments in Washington, D.C.